List of non Iranian players of Esteghlal F.C. are footballers that played for the Iranian club, Esteghlal F.C. As of 15 February 2021 47 footballers from 24 countries played for Esteghlal F.C.

History 
Pierre Karlów was the first non Iranian player joining the club in 1946. Karlów was one of the Polish war refugee who stayed in Iran after the end of World War II.

Key 

 Bold players are/were National players.
 The list is ordered first by date of debut, and then if necessary in alphabetical order.
 Statistics are correct up to and including the match played on 14 February 2021. Where a player left the club permanently after this date, his statistics are updated to his date of leaving.

List

Footnotes

References 

Esteghlal F.C.

Association football player non-biographical articles
Esteghlal